Berhampur University is a Public teaching-cum-affiliating university in Brahmapur, Odisha, India.

History
Berhampur University was established on 2 January 1967 as an affiliating university by the Government of Odisha.

Campus
The present campus is known as Bhanja Vihar, named after one of the greatest poets of Odisha, Kabisamrat Upendra Bhanja.

Academics
The university offers postgraduate courses in three departments: science, humanities, and business studies. These include regular programmes, self-financing programmes (Pharmacy, Education and Finance) and diploma courses. 

The university also offers 28 undergraduate and postgraduate courses through its constituent colleges as well as in distance education mode, through its Harihar Mardaraj Distance Education Centre.

In October 2021, the Khallikote University merged with Berhampur University and the syndicate of the university created four new P.G. departments in Biotechnology, Library & Information Science, Tourism & Travel Studies and Environment Studies.

Accreditation 
Berhampur University was accredited by the National Assessment and Accreditation Council (NAAC) with an "A" grade.

Affiliated colleges
The university has now the jurisdiction over 3 districts viz,  Gajapati, 
Ganjam, Kandhamal.

Notable alumni 

Notable alumni include:
 Arun K. Pati, professor at Harish-Chandra Research Institute and notable quantum physicist
 Giridhar Gamang, former Chief Minister of Odisha
 Dr. Krishna Mohan Pathi, Padma Sri Awardee, Indian orthopedic surgeon from Odisha, India, who is known for his work in Odisha's tribal areas. He treats the poor for free of cost.

 Kulamani Parida, Indian Chemical Scientist. 
 Mrinal Chatterjee, Indian Author and Journalist.
 Samavedam Shanmukha Sarma, Indian spiritual teacher
 Dr. Subrat Kumar Acharya,  gastroenterologist and liver transplant physician
 Ravindra Prasad Patnaik,  Indian music composer, singer, actor, screenwriter and film director, winner of three Filmfare Awards (south) and three Nandi Awards.
 Dr. Satyajit Sahu, Associate Professor and Physicist Indian Institute of Technology Jodhpur
 Umesh Chandra Patra, Indian Zoologist

References

 
Universities in Odisha
Department of Higher Education, Odisha
Education in Berhampur
1967 establishments in Orissa
Educational institutions established in 1967